At various dates in the run up to the next United Kingdom general election, various organisations have carried out opinion polling to gauge the opinions that voters hold towards political leaders. The polling companies listed are members of the British Polling Council (BPC) and abide by its disclosure rules. The date range for opinion polls is from the 2019 United Kingdom general election, held on 12 December, to the present day.

Leadership approval ratings

Rishi Sunak
The following polls asked about voters' opinions on Rishi Sunak, leader of the Conservative Party since 24 October 2022 and Prime Minister of the United Kingdom since 25 October 2022.

2023

2022

Keir Starmer
The following polls asked about voters' opinions on Keir Starmer, leader of the Labour Party and Leader of the Opposition since April 2020.

2023

2022

2021

2020

Ed Davey
The following polls asked about voters' opinions on Ed Davey, leader of the Liberal Democrats since August 2020.

2022

2021

2020

Carla Denyer and Adrian Ramsay 

The following polls asked about voters' opinions on Carla Denyer and Adrian Ramsay, co-leaders of the Green Party of England and Wales since October 2021.

2022

2021

Nicola Sturgeon

The following polls asked about voters' opinions on Nicola Sturgeon, leader of the Scottish National Party and first minister of Scotland since November 2014. These polls asked the opinions of British voters, not specifically Scottish voters.

2022

2021

2020

2019

Approval ratings for former party leaders

Liz Truss 
The following polls asked about voters' opinions on Liz Truss, leader of the Conservative Party and Prime Minister of the United Kingdom from 6 September 2022 and until 25 October 2022.

2022

Boris Johnson
The following polls asked about voters' opinions on Boris Johnson, leader of the Conservative Party and Prime Minister of the United Kingdom from 24 July 2019 to 6 September 2022.

2022

2021

2020

2019

Siân Berry and Jonathan Bartley 
The following polls asked about voters' opinions on Siân Berry and Jonathan Bartley, co-leaders of the Green Party from 4 September 2018 to 31 July 2021.

2021

2020

Nigel Farage
The following polls asked about voters' opinions on Nigel Farage, leader of the Reform UK, formerly named Brexit Party, until 6 March 2021

2021

2020

2019

Jeremy Corbyn
The following polls asked about voters' opinions on Jeremy Corbyn, the former leader of the Labour Party until 4 April 2020.

2020

2019

Preferred Prime Minister  polling 
Some opinion pollsters ask voters which party leader they would prefer as prime minister: Liz Truss (Conservative Party) or Keir Starmer (Labour Party). The questions differ slightly from pollster to pollster:

Opinium: "Which, if any, of the following people do you think would be the best prime minister?"
BMG Research: "If you had to choose between the two, who would you prefer to see as the next Prime Minister?"
YouGov / Survation: "Which of the following do you think would make the best Prime Minister?"
Ipsos MORI: "Who do you think would make the most capable Prime Minister, the Conservative’s Boris Johnson, or Labour’s Sir Keir Starmer?"
ICM: "Putting aside which party you support, and only thinking about your impressions of them as leaders, which one of the following do you think would make the best Prime Minister for Britain?"
Savanta ComRes:  "Which of the following politicians do you think would make the best Prime Minister?"
Redfield & Wilton: "At this moment, which of the following individuals do you think would be the better Prime Minister for the United Kingdom?"
J.L. Partners: "Which of Boris Johnson and Keir Starmer is doing a better job overall at the moment?"
Focaldata:  "If you had to pick one of the following, who do you think would make the best Prime Minister?"

Sunak v Starmer

2023

2022

2021

2020

Starmer vs Truss

2022

Johnson vs Starmer

2022

2021

2020

Preferred Prime Minister and Chancellor polling 
Some pollsters ask voters which potential Prime Minister/Chancellor of the Exchequer pairing they would prefer: Rishi Sunak and Jeremy Hunt for the Conservative Party or Keir Starmer and Rachel Reeves for the Labour Party. Previous iterations contained Liz Truss and Jeremy Hunt, Liz Truss and Kwasi Kwarteng, and Keir Starmer and Anneliese Dodds. Each pollster uses the following wording for this question:

 Deltapoll: "Putting aside any support for a political party you may have, which of the following do you think would be best for the British economy?"
 Ipsos MORI: "do you think that a Labour Government with Keir Starmer as Prime Minister and Rachel Reeves as Chancellor of the Exchequer would do a better or worse job ... than the present government has done at managing the economy?"
 Opinium: "Which, if any, of the following would you say you trust more to handle the economy?"

Sunak and Hunt vs Starmer and Reeves

Johnson and Sunak vs Starmer and Reeves

Graphical summary

Polls conducted

2022

2021

Johnson and Sunak vs Starmer and Dodds

Graphical summary

Polls conducted

2021

2020

Hypothetical polling 
Some pollsters conduct surveys to compare figures who are not both party leaders. These could include a comparison of leading politicians within the same party (to gauge support for future leadership contests), or compare the current leader of one party to an alternative leader of a second. The politicians listed below include: 
 Boris Johnson, Prime Minister of the United Kingdom
 Keir Starmer, Leader of the Labour Party
 Rishi Sunak, Chancellor of the Exchequer
 Michael Gove, Minister for the Cabinet Office
 Andy Burnham, Mayor of Greater Manchester

Johnson vs Sunak

Redfield & Wilton: "At this moment, which of the following individuals do you think would be the better Prime Minister for the United Kingdom?"
Ipsos MORI: "Who do you think would make the most capable Prime Minister"
J.L. Partners: "Of the following two politicians, who do you think would make the best Prime Minister?"

2022

2021

2020

Johnson vs Burnham

Starmer vs Burnham

Gove vs Sunak

Topical polling

Coronavirus handling

The following polls have asked people which leader they think would better handle the COVID-19 pandemic.

See also 
Opinion polling for the next United Kingdom general election
Opinion polling on the United Kingdom rejoining the European Union (2020–present)

References

Leadership approval opinion polling for United Kingdom general elections